Arnold Fine (January 15, 1924 – September 5, 2014) was an editor and columnist, known for editing The Jewish Press and a humor columnist.

He was known for his "I Remember 
When." For decades his writings, which included a companion feature titled "A Bi Gezunt," were on the back page, and subsequently on the inside of the back page.

He also published 2 volumes of Abi Gezunt

Serious side
His I Remember When column at times wiped out his only-humor Abi Gezunt when he had something serious to tell his readers. Going beyond his "Who invented the telephone" (including how many decades it took for the US and UK Patent offices to decide), he tackled topics such as 
 Hiram Bingham IV - Unsung Hero, Righteous Gentile during the Holocaust

Biography
After his military service during World War II, he did news photography for small NYC newspapers and went to college at night. His photography freelancing brought him to The Brooklyn Daily and then The Brooklyn Weekly where he met Shalom Klass, who later founded The Jewish Press.

Following his baccalaureate and a master's degree in education, he became a Special Ed teacher for the NYC school system, working with brain-injured children.

He had Parkinson's disease.

His wife died in 2006.

I Remember When
Atop I Remember When is a unique feature: the letters (and the "!" that follows) are designed to resemble Hebrew letters. For example, the "I" is a "Final Nun." The "R" is a "Koof" with an extra foot.

The series, described as "chronicling Jewish life in New York City in the 1930s and 1940s," was introduced in the mid-1960s, and was said to be "timeless" and transmitting "warmth and nostalgia.” The Jewish Press said they'll reprint Fine's writings.

An assemblage of some columns was published in 1992.

References

External links
 Arnold Fine, Longtime Jewish Press Editor And Columnist, Passes Away At 90
 Arnold Fine, Jewish Press editor and columnist, dies at 90
 Photo of the late Arnold Fine

1924 births
2014 deaths
Jewish humorists
American humorists
Jewish American writers
American newspaper editors
21st-century American Jews